Block voting or bloc voting refers to electoral systems in which multiple candidates are elected at once and a group (voting bloc) of voters can force the system to elect only their preferred candidates. Block voting may be used at large (in a single district with multiple winners) or in several multi-member districts. Most types of block voting fall under the multiple non-transferable vote type of system; these terms are sometimes used synonymously. Block voting is also used synonymously with the term majoritarian representation (winner-takes-all) in the context of multi-winner electoral systems.

The two main types of block voting are plurality block voting, where only a plurality is needed to elect candidates, and majority block voting, where candidates need to reach the support of a majority (more than half) of the electorate to get elected. Plurality block voting is an election with n winners, each voter may choose up to n candidates; the n candidates with most votes win. Majority block voting may use multiple rounds of voting or it may be preferential block voting (multiple transferable votes) using ranked ballots.

Other types include block approval voting: in an election with n winners, each voter may vote for any number of candidates, and the candidates with the most votes win; partial block voting (also known as limited voting): in an election with n winners, each voter may choose up to m (m<n) candidates; the n candidates with the most votes win; and party block voting (also known as the general ticket), in an election where each voter may vote for a party, and that party wins all seats.

Block voting is often contrasted with proportional representation, which methods aim to select winners in a way that every voter's vote counts with the same effective weight, while under block voting the usual result is that where the candidates divide into definitive parties the most popular party in the district sees its full slate of candidates elected, resulting in a landslide.

Terminology 
The term "plurality at-large" is in common usage in elections for representative members of a body who are elected or appointed to represent the whole membership of the body (for example, a city, state, province, nation, club or association). Where the system is used in a territory divided into multi-member electoral districts, the system is commonly referred to as "block voting" or the "bloc vote". Block voting as described in this article is "unlimited voting", unlike "limited voting", where a voter has fewer votes than the number of seats contested. The term "block voting" sometimes means simple plurality election of slates (electoral lists) in multi-member districts. In such a system, each party puts forward a slate (party-list) of candidates, a voter casts just one vote, and the party winning a plurality of votes sees its whole slate elected, winning all the seats.

Types of block voting 
The multiple winners are usually elected simultaneously in one round of voting and the vote is non-transferable, unlike under preferential block voting. MNTV sometimes appears in a runoff (two-round) version, as in some local elections in France, where candidates who do not receive an absolute majority must compete in a second round. In these cases, it is more accurately called "majority-at-large voting".

Plurality block voting (BV) 

In a block voting election, all candidates run against each other for m number of positions, where m is commonly called the district magnitude. Each voter selects up to m candidates on the ballot (voters are sometimes said to have m votes; however, they are unable to vote for the same candidate more than once as is permitted in cumulative voting). Voters are most commonly permitted to cast their votes across more than one party list. The m candidates with the most votes (who may or may not obtain a majority of available votes) are the winners and will fill the positions.

Majority-at-large voting / Two-round block voting 
The majority-at-large voting is the plurality-at-large voting, but candidates who do not receive an absolute majority must compete in a second round.

General ticket / Party block voting (PBV) 

Party block voting (PBV), or general ticket, is the party-list version of the block vote. In contrast to the classic block vote, where the candidates may formally stand as non-partisan and some minority nominations can be theoretically successful, PBV each candidate is linked to their party-list, which is voted by the electors, producing a landslide, and any minority representation is excluded. This system is used to elect the vast majority of the Parliament of Singapore.

Block approval voting 
In block approval voting, every voter may vote for any number of candidates (but no more than once for each candidate).

Block voting, or plurality block voting, is often compared with preferential block voting as both systems tend to produce landslide victories for similar candidates. Instead of a series of checkboxes, preferential block voting uses a preferential ballot, therefore, it is not a multiple non-transferable vote, but a multiple transferable vote. A slate of clones of the top preferred candidate will win every seat under both systems, however, in preferential block voting, this is instead the instant-runoff winner.

Similar systems

Limited voting (LV) / Partial block voting 

Partial block voting, also called limited voting, functions similarly to plurality-at-large voting, however, in partial block voting, each voter receives fewer votes than the number of candidates to be elected. This in turn can enable reasonably sized minorities to achieve some representation, as it becomes impossible for a simple plurality to sweep every seat. Partial bloc voting is used for elections to the Gibraltar Parliament, where each voter has 10 votes and 17 seats are open for election; the usual result is that the most popular party wins 10 seats and forms the ruling administration, while the second-most popular wins seven seats and forms the opposition. Partial block voting is also used in the Spanish Senate, where there are four seats per constituency and each voter receives three votes. Historically, partial block voting was used in three- and four-member constituencies in the United Kingdom, where voters received two votes, until multimember constituencies were abolished.

Under partial block voting, the fewer votes each voter is granted, the smaller the number of voters needed to win becomes, and the more like proportional representation the results can be, provided that voters and candidates use proper strategy.  At the extreme, if each voter receives only one vote, then the voting system becomes equivalent to the single non-transferable vote. Many votes can be wasted, and vote-splitting can produce unfair results (but likely more balanced than elections under Block Voting). Due to these reasons, the portion of votes needed to win a seat under SNTV may be quite small indeed. (Single transferable voting is more scientific, producing less wasted votes. Under STV, the minimum proportion needed to assure victory is the Droop quota, although commonly one or two in each contest are elected with less than that.)

Examples

Plurality block voting and majority block voting 
12 candidates are running in a 3-member district of 10,000 voters. Under both types of block voting, voters may cast 3 votes (but do not have to), but may not cast a more than one vote for a single candidate.

Party A has about 35% support among the electorate (with one particularly well-liked candidate), Party B around 25% (with two well-liked candidates), and the remaining voters primarily support independent candidates, but mostly lean towards Party B if they have to choose between the two parties. All voters vote sincerely, and there is no tactical voting.

In the second round, voters of independent candidates can vote for candidates of party B. As even fewer voters cast all their 3 votes, even in the second round, some winners do technically win with a majority, but only a plurality in fact (similar to differences between turnout levels in two-round voting).

Block voting and approval block voting 
The same 12 candidates are running in a 3-member district of 10,000 voters. Under block voting, voters may not cast a more than one vote for a single candidate.

 Under unlimited block approval voting, voters may vote for any number of candidates.
 Under limited block approval voting, voters may cast 6 votes maximum (twice as many as there are winners).
 Under plurality block voting, voters may cast 3 votes (but do not have to).
 Under limited (block) voting, voters may cast 2 votes maximum.
 Under the single non-transferable vote (which is not block voting), voters may cast only 1 vote.

Party A has about 35% support among the electorate (with one particularly well-liked candidate), Party B around 25% (with two well-liked candidates) and the remaining voters primarily support independent candidates, but mostly lean towards party B if they have to choose between the two parties. All voters vote sincerely, there is no tactical voting.

 Under the single non-transferable vote (not a type of approval voting), the 3 most popular candidates according to voters' first preferences are elected, regardless of party affiliation.
 Under limited voting, it is most likely that the party with a plurality takes 2 seats (the number of votes each voter has), and the minority party receives the remaining seats.
 Under plurality block voting, the party with plurality support most likely wins all seats.
 Under limited block approval voting, voters for independent candidates may use their extra votes to help candidates other than their top 3, which may result in the reversal of the plurality block vote result.
 Under block approval voting, any party-affiliated or independent candidates particularly popular among the population may be elected, but it is possible that about half of the population can elect no representatives.

See also

 Voting bloc
 First-past-the-post voting
 Single non-transferable vote

Notes

References 

 http://www.mtholyoke.edu/offices/comm/oped/voter_rights.shtml
 Rogers v. Lodge, (1982) Supreme Court Case

External links 

 A Handbook of Electoral System Design from International IDEA
 Electoral Design Reference Materials from the ACE Project
 ACE Electoral Knowledge Network Expert site providing encyclopedia on Electoral Systems and Management, country by country data, a library of electoral materials, latest election news, the opportunity to submit questions to a network of electoral experts, and a forum to discuss all of the above

Voting